Sphenophorus venatus, the hunting billbug, is a species of beetle in the family Dryophthoridae. It is found in Central America and North America.

Subspecies
These four subspecies belong to the species Sphenophorus venatus:
 Sphenophorus venatus confluens
 Sphenophorus venatus glyceriae
 Sphenophorus venatus venatus (Say, 1831)
 Sphenophorus venatus vestitus Chittenden, 1904 (hunting billbug)

References

Further reading

 
 

Dryophthorinae
Articles created by Qbugbot
Beetles described in 1831